The following lists events that happened during the 1750s in South Africa.

Events

1750
 30 March - Ryk Tulbagh is appointed Governor of the Cape Colony

1754
 A population count shows that there were 5,510 Europeans and 6,279 slaves in the Cape Colony

1755
 The foundation stone of Old Town House in Cape Town is laid
 1 May - A Smallpox epidemic breaks out at the Cape Colony. A total of 2,372 people die

References
See Years in South Africa for list of References

History of South Africa